Louis Udoh (born 25 August 1974 in Lagos) is a former Nigerian football player. He also holds Russian citizenship.

References

1974 births
Living people
Nigerian footballers
Nigerian expatriate footballers
Naturalised citizens of Russia
Nigerian people of Russian descent
Expatriate footballers in Austria
FC Admira Wacker Mödling players
FC Chernomorets Novorossiysk players
Russian Premier League players
Expatriate footballers in Russia
FC SKA-Khabarovsk players
Russian people of Nigerian descent
Association football defenders
FC Dynamo Makhachkala players